Home of Peace may refer to the building below or following cemeteries:

 Home of Peace Cemetery (East Los Angeles), California
Home of Peace Cemetery (Helena, Montana)
Home of Peace Cemetery (Colma, California)
Home of Peace Cemetery (Oakland, California)
Home of Peace Cemetery (Porterville, California)
Home of Peace Cemetery (Sacramento, California)
Home of Peace Cemetery (San Diego, California)
Home of Peace Cemetery (San Jose, California)
Home of Peace Cemetery (Santa Cruz, California)
Home of Peace Cemetery (Weld County, Colorado)
Home of Peace Cemetery (Alexandria, Virginia)
Home of Peace Cemetery (Lakewood, Washington)

See also 

 Inter-Korean Peace House - Korea DMZ